Nabadwip Lok Sabha constituency was one of the 543 parliamentary constituencies of India. This constituency was in the state of West Bengal. This constituency was reserved for Scheduled castes over certain periods.

Assembly segments
In 2004, Nabadwip Lok Sabha constituency was composed of the following assembly segments:
 Nabadwip (assembly constituency no. 77)
 Shantipur (assembly constituency no. 78)
 Hanskhali (SC) (assembly constituency no. 79)
 Ranaghat East (SC) (assembly constituency no. 80)
 Ranaghat West (assembly constituency no. 81)
 Chakdaha (assembly constituency no. 82)
 Haringhata (assembly constituency no. 83)

As a consequence of the order of the Delimitation Commission in respect of the delimitation of constituencies in the West Bengal, Nabadwip parliamentary constituency ceased to exist from 2009; most of the assembly segments of this constituency are part of new Ranaghat Lok Sabha constituency.

Members of Parliament

For MPs from this area in subsequent years see Ranaghat Lok Sabha constituency.

Election results

General election 2004

Bye election 2003
The Bye election occurred on 5 June 2003 due to death of sitting MP Ananda Mohan Biswas on 3 February 2003.
Alakesh Das of CPI(M) Defeated Abir Ranjan Biswas of Trinamool Congress, the son of Ananda Mohan Biswas.

General elections 1951-2004
In 1951, there were two constituencies = Santipur and Nabadwip. From 1957 it was Nabadwip only. Most of the contests were multi-cornered. However, only winners and runners-up are mentioned below:

See also
Nabadwip
List of Constituencies of the Lok Sabha

References

Former Lok Sabha constituencies of West Bengal
Politics of Nadia district
1951 establishments in West Bengal
Constituencies established in 1951
Former constituencies of the Lok Sabha
2008 disestablishments in India
Constituencies disestablished in 2008